Robert Green McCloskey (18 January 1916 – 4 August 1969) was an American political historian.

McCloskey completed his doctorate in political science at Harvard University, and joined the faculty in 1948. He was secretary of the Littauer Center of Public Administration until 1954, when Arthur Maass took the position. McCloskey was awarded a Guggenheim Fellowship in 1959. In 1966, McCloskey was named Jonathan Trumbull Professor of American History and Government at Harvard. The position had been vacant since 1963, upon the death of V. O. Key. McCloskey died on 4 August 1969.

McCloskey's book American Conservatism in the Age of Enterprise was first published in 1951. The book was based on his doctoral dissertation, and explored conservatism in the United States from the Reconstruction era to 1910, by considering the publications of William Graham Sumner, Stephen Johnson Field, and Andrew Carnegie. The first edition of The American Supreme Court was published in 1961 as part of a series, and described as "lucidly written, well-reasoned, and concise" by Robert J. Harris, and "one of the best of a rare breed" by Paul W. Fox. In 2011, Keith E. Whittington called it "the classic one-volume history of the Court." Following his death, a student of McCloskey's, Sanford Levinson, continued updating The American Supreme Court. A third book by McCloskey, titled The Modern Supreme Court, was posthumously published in 1974.

References

1916 births
1968 deaths
20th-century American historians
American male non-fiction writers
20th-century American male writers
Harvard University alumni
Harvard University faculty
American political scientists
Political historians
20th-century political scientists